Asia e University (AeU) is an international university in Subang Jaya, Malaysia that offers on-campus, blended and online learning mode programmes.  An institution set in Asia, by Asians, and for Asia – founded by the Asia Cooperation Dialogue foreign ministers. Asia Cooperation Dialogue is represented by the foreign ministers of 34 Asia Pacific countries, and it aims to promote cooperation in areas like education, through projects such as Asia e University at the Islamabad 2005 and Doha 2006 Asia Cooperation Dialogue ministerial meetings.

The university is a member of the Association of Commonwealth Universities and other international higher educational organizations. The small letter "e" in the name of the university represents empowered learning, enhanced learning, exploratory learning, expanding learning, effective learning, electronic learning, experiential learning and entrepreneurial learning which attributes the university's missions and visions. The main campus is situated in Kuala Lumpur, with learning centres in most of the states of Malaysia, as well as in other countries. AeU has a network of locations to deliver undergraduate, postgraduate and executive development programmes and the foundation programmes in partnership with University of London.

Faculties
There are five schools under Asia e University:
 School of Management
 School of Education and Cognitive Science
 School of Science and Technology
 School of Arts, Humanities and Social Sciences
 School of Graduate Studies

AeU has collaborated with several universities, institutions and corporations both inside and outside countries in the Asia Cooperation Dialogue. Currently, AeU has established international collaborative study centres in Kenya, Somalia, Nigeria, Bahrain, Bangladesh, Cambodia, China, Denmark, Dubai, Hong Kong, India, Indonesia, Maldives, Mauritius, Myanmar, Namibia, Nepal, New Zealand, Pakistan, Sri Lanka, Thailand, UK, Vietnam and Yemen.

Accredited Programmes

 Doctor of Philosophy (Business Administration)
 Doctor of Philosophy (Education)
 Doctor of Philosophy (Humanities)
 Doctor of Philosophy (Social and Behavioural Science)
Doctor of Philosophy (Finance)
 Doctor of Philosophy (Information & Communication Technology)
 Doctor of Business Administration
 Master of Business Administration
 Master in Management
 Master of Human Resource Management
 Master of Science (Management)
 Master of Science (Strategic Marketing) 
 Master of Education
 Master in Information & Communication Technology Management
 Bachelor of Business Administration (Hons)
 Bachelor of Education (Early Childhood Education) (Hons)
 Bachelor of Education (Teaching English as a Second Language) (Hons)
 Bachelor of Education (Teaching Malay Language in Primary School) (Hons)
 Bachelor of Information & Communication Technology (Hons)
 Bachelor of Information & Communication Technology (Cooperation In CCIT Faculty of Engineering Universitas Indonesia)
 Bachelor of Digital Creative Media (Hons)
Bachelor of Arts (Hons) in Graphic Design
 Bachelor of Education (Teaching Islamic Studies in Primary School) (Hons)
 Graduate Diploma in Early Childhood Education
 Graduate Diploma in Business Management
 Diploma Pengajian Islam

Memberships

AeU is a member of:
 Asian Association of Open Universities
 Association of Commonwealth Universities
 The Observatory on Borderless Higher Education
 Asia Pacific University Community Engagement Network
 International Council for Open and Distance Education
 International Consortium for Teaching and Learning Centres
 Association of Asia-Pacific Business Schools
 The Association of Southeast Asia Institutions of Higher Learning
 The Chartered Management Institute (CMI) United Kingdom

The university was founded and supported by 34 ACD countries:

Afghanistan, Bahrain, Bangladesh, Bhutan, Brunei Darussalam, Cambodia, China, India, Indonesia, Iran, Japan, Kazakhstan (since 2003), Republic of Korea, Kuwait, Kyrgyz Republic, Laos PDR, Malaysia, Mongolia, Myanmar, Oman, Pakistan, Philippines, Qatar, Russian Federation, Saudi Arabia, Singapore, Sri Lanka, Tajikistan, Thailand, Turkey, United Arab Emirates, Uzbekistan and Vietnam.

Notable alumni

 Tan Sri Datuk Seri Dr Syed Hamid Albar, Doctor of Philosophy (Business Administration) 2014, Former Minister of Home Affairs  Malaysia and Chancellor of the Asia e University.
Datuk Dr Mary Yap Kain Ching, Doctor of Philosophy (Education) 2016, Former Deputy Minister of Higher Education Malaysia
Dr David Richard Namwandi, Doctor of Philosophy (Business Administration) 2014,Former Minister of Education Namibia
Dr Abdullah Rasheed Ahmed, Doctor of Philosophy (Education) 2016, Minister of State for Education Maldives
Mr Mafio Matthew Mlambo, Master of Business Administration (MBA) 2015, Former Minister from the Embassy of the Republic of Zimbabwe in Malaysia

References

External links
 Official Asia e University (AeU) Website

Educational institutions established in 2002
Universities and colleges in Kuala Lumpur
Business schools in Malaysia
Information technology schools in Malaysia
Distance education institutions based in Malaysia
2002 establishments in Malaysia
Private universities and colleges in Malaysia